King's Quest is an adventure game developed by Sierra On-Line and published originally for the IBM PCjr in 1984 and later for several other systems between 1984 and 1989. The game was originally titled King's Quest; the subtitle Quest for the Crown was added to the game box in the 1987 re-release, but did not appear in the game.

It is the first official part of the long King's Quest series (not counting 1980's Wizard and the Princess), in which a young knight, Sir Graham, must save the Kingdom of Daventry to become the king. Designed by Roberta Williams, the game was revolutionary and highly influential in the evolution of the graphic adventure game genre by introducing more detailed graphics and animation.

An official remake titled King's Quest I: Quest for the Crown was released in 1990. An unofficial remake was released by Tierra Entertainment in 2001.

Gameplay

King's Quest features interactive graphics that were an enormous leap over the mostly static rooms of previous graphical interactive fiction. Earlier typical adventure games present the player a pre-drawn scene, accompanied by a text description. The player's interaction consists entirely of typing commands into the game's parser, then reading the parser's response, because the on-screen graphics rarely change except when the player moves to a new location.

King's Quest is the first adventure game to integrate graphical animation into the player's view of the game world. This shifts the focus away from the static scenery, to the player's character, which is animated on-screen. Animation sequences are in most player interactions reachable through the normal course of exploration. For example, animation sequences show Graham picking up objects from the ground, opening doors, and wading through water. Depth perspective is simulated; Graham can walk behind objects, causing his character to be hidden from view, or walk in front of them, obscuring the object. This attention to graphical animation, commonplace in action games, earned King's Quest the distinction as the first "3D-animated" adventure game.

The original version of the game relies primarily on textual input as its interface. As the player uses the keyboard to explore the game world, the on-screen character, Graham, is animated walking to the chosen destination. The fantasy world of Daventry consists of an 8×6 cyclic array of screens (or rooms) that make up the outdoor world in which the player can navigate freely, plus about 30 additional screens for indoor, sky, and underground places.

King's Quests innovation includes 16-color graphics for the IBM PC platform. The game uses the PCjr and Tandy 1000's Video Gate Array and enhanced sound, and Color Graphics Adapter (CGA) computers can display 16-color graphics with artifact colors on a composite color monitor or television. Selecting RGB mode at the title screen instead results in the usual 320×200 CGA graphics mode, limited to 4 colors. In this mode, dithering simulates extra colors. Like previous static-screen Sierra adventures, King's Quest uses vector graphics rather than pre-rendered bitmaps, which would take far too much disk space. Each screen is drawn line-by-line and painted in. This technique is in all Sierra adventure games up to King's Quest V.

Plot

King's Quest
In the original version for the IBM PCjr, the story is simple. The Kingdom of Daventry is suffering from recent disasters and hardship. King Edward calls his bravest knight, Sir Grahame, to his throne, and tells him he has heard of three legendary treasures hidden throughout the land that would end Daventry's troubles. If Grahame succeeds, he will become king. In later releases, the knight's name was changed to Graham.

King's Quest: Quest for the Crown
Since the game's fourth release (1984) and the repackaged fifth release (1987), the backstory was greatly expanded. The Kingdom of Daventry is in serious trouble, after its precious magical items have been stolen. One day, King Edward the Benevolent rescued a beautiful young Princess Dahlia of Cumberland, but on the night of their wedding she was discovered to actually be an evil witch who stole the king's treasure. Knowing that he had to save the kingdom, the dying King Edward sends his bravest knight, Sir Graham, to Cumberland. His quest is to rid the land of the treacherous witch, outwit the other assorted villains, and retrieve the three lost treasures. Because he had no heir, if Graham should succeed, he would become the next king.

Sir Graham embarked upon a quest for the items through Daventry, climbing a magic beanstalk to the Land of the Clouds where he recovered the chest of gold, facing leprechauns to retrieve the shield and a dragon to get back the mirror. After retrieving all the items, Graham returned to the throne room in time to present them to the king before he died. As the king died, he passed on rule of Daventry to Sir Graham as promised.

Development
In late 1982, IBM contacted Sierra On-Line for launch games for its forthcoming PCjr home computer, announced in November 1983. Among the software Sierra developed was King's Quest, the first animated adventure game. To create the interactive animation, the King's Quest development process deployed a prototype version of what would eventually become the Adventure Game Interpreter (AGI) game engine. This prototype engine was developed by Arthur Abraham, who was released from the King's Quest project in the middle of development. Some early reporting on the game referred to the development system as the "Game Adaptation Language" (GAL). In addition to the designer and writer Roberta Williams, six full-time programmers worked for 18 months to complete the game.

IBM requested a sophisticated and replayable adventure game, and paid for much of the $850,000 development cost. IBM stated in advertisements that King's Quest "runs on the IBM PCjr and makes good use of some special PCjr capabilities", with "unusually smooth and realistic" animation and "an impressive variety of sound effects". Its discontinuation of the computer in March 1985 stunned Sierra. Due to the PCjr's poor reception, King's Quest did not sell very well. With the advantage of the development system, Sierra was able to quickly release versions for the Tandy 1000, standard PCs, and the Apple IIe, which helped propel sales.

Self-booting IBM PC compatible versions require 128 KB of memory:

The game was re-released for DOS in 1986 using Sierra's updated AGI version 2 engine. It was also ported to the Amiga and Atari ST at the same time, and eventually to the Sega Master System. This 256K DOS version of King's Quest lacks some sound effects present in the booter versions, including birds chirping and distinct sounds for each enemy. It also adds some musical cues from King's Quest II, including "Greensleeves" replacing the original simple fanfare at the title screen (the original fanfare still plays when the doors of Castle Daventry open). Background pictures are now drawn into an off-screen buffer to avoid the painting effect of the original game. This was not done merely for the sake of tidiness, but because the booter versions inadvertently reveal some puzzle solutions by drawing hidden objects first, followed by scenery.

IBM PC compatible versions require 256K memory. All versions were published by Sierra.

November 13, 1986, Version 1.0U: Updated version, says "New version" on the title screen. Displays text in windows. Supports EGA graphics and runs from hard disks as well, although a key disk is required upon startup. Requires DOS 2.0, IBM PC with CGA graphics or PCjr/Tandy 1000. Unique in showing a discolored leaf at the title screen. Sold in the same gray flip-lid box as the 128K self-booting versions, with a gray triangular sticker denoting the 256K version, and a gold sticker stating "Now supports EGA".
May 5, 1987, Version 2.0F, interpreter version 2.425: Adds pull-down menus. Supports Hercules graphics and modifies the EGA graphics code to run on machines with an 80386 processor. Sold both in the original gray flip-lid box as well as a gold slipcover box. The gold slipcover box adds the sub-title "Quest for the Crown" for the first time, even as it is not mentioned in the game itself. First version of the game that was also available on 3.5" 720K disks.
December 1, 1987, Version 2.0F, interpreter version 2.917: Adds support for MCGA graphics.

All floppy-disk based releases of the 128K and 256K versions use different forms of on-disk copy protection.

Other versions:
1984, Apple IIe & IIc: A version for Apple, based on the self-booting PC/Tandy 1000 version. Requires the 128k IIe or IIc to run.
1986, Amiga/Atari ST: Ports for 68000-based machines based on the 256K PC version 1.0U.
1988, Apple IIGS: Based on the 256K PC versions, adds PCM sound effects and new music composed by Al Lowe.

King's Quest was not ported to the Commodore 64, the most important computer game platform. Roberta Williams said that the limitations of its graphic system (three colors per 8x8 block) did not permit the level of graphics detail Sierra wanted. In addition, the computer's 64k of memory is too small for the complex AGI engine. She said that she had always wanted to make an adventure game with animation, but it was not possible up to then.

Sega Master System
The 1989 Master System port uses its own engine, with a verb/noun interface similar to early LucasArts games. It has original tile and sprite-based graphics and was published by Parker Brothers, who in turn outsourced development to micro smiths, as had been done for Montezuma's revenge. The game is based on the original King's Quest, and shares the puzzles and points-list of that game. Some of the puzzles and rooms have been modified a bit (for example, the boulder covering the dagger rolls a different direction than in PC). An extra item exists — it is now possible to pick up the three-leaf clovers. There are some extra places to die (including a dangerous staircase added to an exit of the Leprechauns' realm). It is non-linear, and the three treasures can be collected in any order, like in the original PC version. Game saves are done through passwords.

1990 remake
King's Quest I: Quest for the Crown is a 1990 remake of King's Quest. This release is the "Enhanced" version of King's Quest. It uses the Sierra's Creative Interpreter (SCI) engine, the same engine used in games such as King's Quest IV; while it still uses 16-color graphics, it features twice the resolution, and music card support instead of the PC speaker. There are two different box variations for this release: one with the same gold slipcover box as the 1987 256K version 2.0F and a box created specifically for the remake.

The game is described as a 1.5 (1 1/2) remake of King's Quest I.

The 1990 SCI EGA "Enhanced" version of King's Quest: Quest for the Crown was announced for the Atari ST line of computers and later canceled. It was announced via Sierra News Magazine in spring 1991, saying owners could send disk #1 or the front cover of the manual along with a check or money order for $20 to upgrade their copy to the enhanced version.

Collections
Both versions of King's Quest I have been released in assorted collections beginning with the King's Quest 15th Anniversary Collector's Edition (1994), followed by the King's Quest Collection (1995), the King's Quest Collection Series (1996) and Roberta Williams Anthology (1997). The 2006 collection lacked the original AGI version of King's Quest, and contained only the SCI remake. This version was released on Steam in 2009. The original AGI version appears in the KQ1+2+3 collection released on GOG, but the SCI remake is not included.

Fan remake
In 2001, the group AGD Interactive (then known as Tierra Entertainment) released an unofficial remake based on Sierra's 1990 version, updating the graphics to use VGA colors, dropping the parser in favor of an interface that mimics that of King's Quest V, and full speech - including the voice of the original voice actor for King Graham in Sierra's official CD-ROM full-speech versions of King's Quest V and VI, Josh Mandel. This was later updated with original hand-drawn artwork.

Reception

The Master System version was given an average score of 6 out of 10 by reviewers in Electronic Gaming Monthly who highlighted its difficulty and its lack of appeal to Sega fans.

The 1990 enhanced version was described by critics and fans alike at the time as "destroying a classic", and was compared to the controversial practice of colorizing classic black and white movies. The remake was a critical failure and prevented the release of further remakes in the series.

In 2020, The Strong National Museum of Play inducted King’s Quest to its World Video Game Hall of Fame.

References

External links
 
 
 The History of KQ1 at Adventure Classic Gaming
 King's Quest I AGI Technical Help on the Sierra Help Pages
 King's Quest I SCI Technical Help on the Sierra Help Pages
Review in GAMES Magazine

1980s interactive fiction
1984 video games
Adventure games
Amiga games
Apple II games
Apple IIGS games
Atari ST games
DOS games
Fangames
Games commercially released with DOSBox
King's Quest
Master System games
Point-and-click adventure games
ScummVM-supported games
Sierra Entertainment games
Tandy 1000 games
Video games about witchcraft
Video games set in castles
World Video Game Hall of Fame
Video games developed in the United States
Single-player video games